Bord Khun District is in Deyr County, Bushehr province, Iran. At the 2006 census, its population was 9,369 in 1,941 households. The following census in 2011 counted 9,758 people in 2,429 households. At the latest census in 2016, the district had 11,113 inhabitants living in 3,030 households.

References 

Districts of Bushehr Province
Populated places in Deyr County